Cucumovirus is a genus of viruses, in the family Bromoviridae. Plants serve as natural hosts. There are four species in this genus.

Taxonomy
The following species are assigned to the genus:
 Cucumber mosaic virus
 Gayfeather mild mottle virus
 Peanut stunt virus
 Tomato aspermy virus

Structure
Viruses in the genus Cucumovirus are non-enveloped, with icosahedral and  Spherical geometries, and T=3 symmetry. The diameter is around 29 nm. Genomes are linear and segmented, tripartite.

Life cycle
Viral replication is cytoplasmic. Entry into the host cell is achieved by penetration into the host cell. Replication follows the positive stranded RNA virus replication model. Positive stranded rna virus transcription, using the internal initiation model of subgenomic rna transcription is the method of transcription. The virus exits the host cell by tubule-guided viral movement. Plants serve as the natural host. Transmission routes are mechanical and contact.

Epidemiology
It is thought that cucumoviruses are present worldwide, being known to occur in Eurasia, Australia, Canada, France, India, Japan, North and South Korea, Morocco, New Zealand, Poland, Spain, the US, and the former USSR.  Its natural hosts belong to the domain Eukaryota.  The virus is transmitted by vector, mechanical inoculation, grafting, or seeds, and it is transmitted in a non-persistent manner.  The vectors may be arthropods, specifically insects of the order Hemiptera, family aphidae (colloquially one would say cucumovirus is transmitted by aphids).

References

External links
 ICTV Report: Bromoviridae
 ICTVdb Virus Description
 Viralzone: Cucumovirus

Bromoviridae
Viral plant pathogens and diseases
Virus genera